Milladoiro is a music band from Galicia. Often compared to the Chieftains, it is among the world's top Celtic music groups.

Biography 
In 1978, Rodrigo Romaní and Antón Seoane released an album named "Milladoiro", on which they were joined by Xosé V. Ferreirós, then credited as a guest artist. The album received a critic's award the same year.

Ferreirós, along with Nando Casal and Moncho García Rei, from his group Faíscas do Xiabre, invited Romaní and Seoane as guests in their next album.

The fusion of the two groups, with the addition of the flautist Xosé A. Méndez and the violinist Laura Quintillán, constituted the foundation of Milladoiro, which swept the Galician musical scene of the 20th century.

To commemorate the 25th anniversary of the band, a compilation album, XXV, was released in 2005.

In 2006, Chris Thile covered their song "O Santo De Polvora" on his album How to Grow a Woman from the Ground.

Line-up 
Founding members
 Rodrigo Romaní: harps, bouzouki, acoustic guitar, jaw harp (1978-2000)
 Xosé Ferreirós: bagpipes, mandolin, tin whistle, bouzouki, percussion (1978- )
 Nando Casal: bagpipes, clarinet, tin whistle, percussion, voice (1978- )
 Antón Seoane: keyboards, guitar, hurdy-gurdy, accordion, voice (1978- )
 Xosé Méndez: flutes (1979- )
 Moncho García Rei: bodhrán, percussion, voice (1978- )
 Laura Quintillán: violin (1979-1980)

Others
 Michel Canadá: violin (1980-1993)
 Antón Seijó: violin (1993-1999)
 Harry C.: violin (1999- )
 Roi Casal: Celtic harp, bouzouki, ocarina, percussions (2000- )
 Manú Conde: guitars, bouzouki (2000- )

Discography 
1979 A Galicia de Maeloc
1980 O Berro Seco
1982 Milladoiro 3
1984 Solfafria
1986 Galicia no país das Maravillas
1987 Divinas palabras
1989 Castellum Honesti
1991 Galicia No Tempo
1993 A Via Láctea
1993 A Xeometría da Alma
1994 Iacobus Magnus
1995 Gallaecia Fulget
1995 As fadas de estraño nome
1999 No confín dos verdes castros
1999 Auga de Maio
1999 Cabana de Bergantiños
2002 O niño do sol
2002 Adobrica Suite
2005 Milladoiro album
2006 Unha estrela por guîa
2008 A quinta das lágrimas
2016 Milladoiro en Ortigueira (CD+DVD)
2018 Atlántico

See also
 Galician traditional music

References

External links 

 
First recorded fansite

Musicians from Galicia (Spain)
Celtic music groups
Galician musical groups
Galician traditional music groups